, known as simply Tenchi Muyo! in North America, is a collection of Japanese OVAs created by Masaki Kajishima and animated by AIC. Initially released in 1992, it marked the beginning of the Tenchi Muyo! franchise, composed of several manga, OVAs, TV series, and other related media. The first two OVA series were later licensed and distributed in North America by Pioneer Entertainment, with Funimation taking over the rights for the third series, and later taking over the rights for the first two OVAs. In 2020, Crunchyroll acquired worldwide streaming rights (outside Asia) for the fourth and fifth seasons of the OVA.

The distribution of the first OVA series was originally started in September 1992 and released six episodes that lasted until 1993. The first series was so successful that a seventh special episode was released in September 1993, followed by a second OVA series with six additional episodes that begun distribution in September 1994 and lasted for one year until September 1995. However, the second OVA series ended on a cliffhanger and it was not until nearly eight years later in 2003 that a third OVA series was distributed in Japan. The third OVA series continued the Tenchi Muyo OVA storyline with six episodes, followed by a special episode released in September 2005 that concluded the third OVA storyline.

The Ultimate Collection box set release of the first two OVAs from Geneon was one of the few releases from the company to feature THX-certified audio and video.

On October 16, 2015, a fourth OVA series was announced to be in production, the first episode of which was released on November 30, 2016. Subsequent episodes were released with an interval of three months each, and the final part of the series arrived on September 13, 2017. On July 12, 2019, it was announced that a fifth OVA series was in development with Masaki Kajishima again serving as chief director and Hideki Shirane writing and overseeing scripts.  Keitaro Motonaga is credited as director.  The six-episode OVA series was released from February 28, 2020 to May 28, 2021.

Plot summary

Characters

Protagonists
 Tenchi Masaki
 A teenager who accidentally releases the space pirate Ryoko. His actions unintentionally cause the destruction of his school and the revelation that he is part-Juraian and a member of their royal family. In the 1st OVA it is revealed that he can create Light Hawk Wings (the power of the goddesses and Jurai ships) without the aid of a royal tree, and can also perform energy-matter conversion.
 Ryoko Hakubi
 A creation of the scientist Washu Hakubi (of her own egg and a substance called Masu), Ryoko was a space pirate in the service of Kagato until she was sealed in a cave for 700 years; she is released by Tenchi in the first episode. She draws most of her powers from three mysterious gems and is partnered with the cabbit spaceship Ryo-Ohki.
 Ryo-Ohki
 The title character appears as a grey-colored cabbit (a cross between a cat and rabbit), and can transform into a spaceship. 
 Ayeka Masaki Jurai
 A princess of the Juraian Royal Family, she is searching the galaxy for her half-brother and future betrothed Yosho with her sister Sasami when she detects Ryoko (whom Yosho had been pursuing prior to his disappearance) her tree-ship Ryu-Oh crashes on Earth, where she reluctantly joins Tenchi and Ryoko.
 Sasami Masaki Jurai
 Ayeka's younger sister, and also a princess of the Juraian Royal Family. She stows away on Ayeka's ship prior to the search for Yosho. She has also merged with the Goddess Tsunami, which grants the Jurai family its royal trees. Sasami frequently cooks for the household.
 Mihoshi Kuramitsu
 A member of the powerful Kuramitsu family of the Seniwa empire and a Detective of the Galaxy Police, Mihoshi is prone to clumsiness and can act ditzy, despite being highly intelligent. Mihoshi is distantly related to Washu, and through that lineage has the power of improbably good luck. She crashes on Earth while looking for Kagato.
 Washu Hakubi
 A former Director of the Galaxy Academy and ranked as the top scientist in the universe, Washu's more recent pursuits involve investigating the three gems (the ones Ryoko were given) and creating lifeforms capable of harnessing their power (of which the Ryoko/Ryo-Ohki combination is one). She was trapped by Kagato and later released by Mihoshi. It is revealed in OVA 3 that Washu is a human manifestation of a sister-goddess to Tsunami and Tokimi.
 Noike Kamiki Jurai
 Noike Kamiki Jurai was raised in an orphanage, and later joined the Galaxy Police. She was Mihoshi's partner and was adopted by Seto Kamiki Jurai, Ayeka and Sasami's grandmother, and is introduced as Tenchi's fiancée in OVA 3. The engagement, however, is a political pretense to allow her to monitor the powerful members of the household.

Villains and antagonists
 Kagato
 A former student of Washu (revealed in spin-off media as a creation of hers) In the pursuit of science he frequently pillages ruins for relics with no regard to life or property, earning him the nickname 'Ruins Buster' and status of Eternally Wanted by the Galaxy Police. Kagato is the main antagonist of the 1st OVA making an attempt to recover Ryoko (whom he previously brainwashed into serving him) and use the power of her gems to capture Tsunami.
 Doctor Clay
 A former colleague and academic rival of Washu from the Galaxy Academy, he is in service to Lady Tokimi in OVA 2 (in which he is the primary adversary) and is ordered by her to capture Washu and bring her to Tokimi. Clay uses the shape-shifting android Zero to replace Ryoko and capture Washu. However he is outsmarted by Washu, captured and handed over to the Galaxy Police.
 Tokimi
  is a mysterious hyperdimensional being (stated to be beyond all dimensional space) who is one of the "Choushin", the greatest "goddesses" in existence. Her sisters are Tsunami and Washu. Introduced in the second OVA series, where she orders Dr. Clay to bring Washu to her. Tokimi is not portrayed as an antagonist in the 3rd OVA, since she considers Tenchi as the result of their research to find a being even more powerful than herself, theorising that it might have created the Choushin themselves. While Tsunami and Washu were experimenting within the lower universes to try to discover an even higher level being, Tokimi was left in-charge of all 22-dimensional reality and controls it from the Hyper-dimension through higher-dimensional supervisors to conduct higher order chaos experiments. Though Tokimi's actions lead to trouble for Tenchi and his group, Tokimi turns out not to be a true villain as there was no malice in her actions but simply lacked the wisdom of her sisters. Tokimi now currently lives with the Tenchi family, as a smaller form, Toki-Chan.
 
 Z
  (full name Z-0001332536893) is the principal antagonist of the third OVA series of Tenchi Muyo! Ryo-Ohki. An anomalous being of great power, capable of punching holes through planets seemingly without effort.  He is capable of creating Lighthawk Wings created through the experiments of Lady Tokimi. Throughout the 3rd OVA, he stalks Tenchi and his household, setting up a confrontation between Tenchi and Misao Kuramitsu and ultimately battling Tenchi to prove his superiority and disrupt the choushin plans. Z is portrayed as suffering from the loss of his family and resentful of the Goddesses and their meddling, despite serving Tokimi.
 
 The Counter-Actor
 The  is an anomalous being created as the sum total sentient "counter-force" from the Choushin Goddesses' sum total experimentation on 22-dimensional reality, and somehow merging with queen Misaki of Jurai. It is capable of causing their lower-dimensional shadows physical injury (visually appearing to corrupt their body, turning them black). Z found her in the future and used her in his plans to kill Tenchi and stop Tokimi's experiments. The counter-actor is stopped and healed by a kiss from the ascended future Tenchi and is revealed to be Masaki Misaki Jurai (The 2nd Empress of Jurai and mother of Ayeka and Sasami) from some point in the future.
 Background information released by the series creator indicates the Counter-Actor is from a point in the distant future (ten thousand years or more) when both her husband Azusa, and her co-wife Funaho have passed on, which caused Misaki to eventually go mad from her grief and destructive power. According to this information, during his time travel after being struck by Z's Light Hawk Wing, Tenchi was to encounter Misaki in her future time. Unfortunately, while planned, it was cut from the OVA.

Minor
For other characters within the OVA continuity that make a brief appearance in the OVA series, see also: Tenchi Muyo! GXP.

   
 Tenchi's three classmates who make brief appearances: Kazuhiko Amagasaki appears briefly in Episode 1 of OVA 1. Kamikura and Ikeda appear in the first episode of OVA 3.  Amagasaki is also a recurring character in Tenchi in Tokyo.
 Amagasaki voiced by: Toshiharu Sakurai (Japanese), Mark Tracy (English)
 Kamikura voiced by: Wataru Takagi (Japanese),  Crispin Freeman (English)
 Ikeda  voiced by: Yasuhiro Fujiwara (Japanese),  Kirk Thornton (English)
 Galaxy Police Commander
 A Wau by birth, the Galaxy Police commander answers directly to the Galaxy Police Marshal, Minami Kuramitsu.  He appeared in OVA 1, episode 4, then again in the final episode in OVA 2.  His desk is always covered with a lot of paperwork, mostly concerning Mihoshi.
 Voiced by: Hiroshi Masuoka (Japanese), Dan Butler (English ep. 4), Harry Johnson (English ep. 13)
 
 Nobeyama is Mihoshi's immediate superior in the Galaxy Police.  He is also secretly a member of Jurai Intelligence, and relayed Mihoshi's report on the Kagato Incident, since it contained sensitive information about Jurai's royal trees.
 Voiced by: Takurō Kitagawa (Japanese), Harry Johnson (English, credited as David Johnson in OVA 1)
 
 Yukinojo is Mihoshi's spacecraft, as well as the artificial intelligence that operates it.
 Voiced by: Hideyuki Umezu (Japanese), Mark Tracy (English)
 Akie Masaki (Onsen Keeper)
 First appearing in OVA 1 episode 4, she is Tenchi's great-aunt on his father's side (making her a descendant of Yosho through his first wife, Kasumi (a niece of his mother, the Empress Funaho, not to be mistaken with Tenchi's cousin, Kasumi (Baby Taro's mother), who was named for her)).  Her name was revealed in OVA 4, where she's also revealed to be a Masaki Clan Elder, and Kei Masaki's elder sister (or, at least, an elder sister-figure to her, as Kei addresses her as 'big sister'), making her also Kasumi Masaki's aunt and baby Taro Masaki's great-aunt.  In episode 24, Akie and Kei, along with Washu, serve as midwives at Kenshi Masaki's birth.  
 Voiced by: Hisako Kyōda (Japanese), Zita Campisi (English OVA 1), Kate T. Vogt (English OVA 2)
 
 Tenchi's infant cousin, he appears in the first episode of OVA 2.  When his mother becomes ill, his grandmother, Tenchi's aunt, Kei Masaki, Tenchi's cousin Kasumi's mother (who's not to be mistaken with her ancestor, Yosho's first wife, Kasumi), sends Taro to live with Tenchi and the girls until his mother got better.  Makes an appearance in the second episode of OVA 4.
 Voiced by: Miki Narahashi (Japanese), Sherry Lynn (English)
 Mass or Masu
 Mass, or Masu, are communal creatures allegedly discovered by Naja Akara, and what Washu used to create Ryoko and Ryo-Ohki.  These creatures have anti-matter capabilities, and often pattern their thought patterns after the strongest mind they find.
 
 D3 is a dimensional supervisor, specifically the supervisor of the 3rd dimension. He serves Lady Tokimi and the other Goddesses. 
 Voiced by: Ryūzaburō Ōtomo (Japanese), Jack Fletcher (English OVA 2), Michael McConnohie (English OVA 3)
 
 Nakita is the father of Mihoshi and Misao and a military officer that briefly appears at the end of episode 16.
 Voiced by: Junichi Suwabe (Japanese), Kirk Thornton (English)
 Mashisu Makibi
 Misao Kuramitsu's assistant onboard the Choubimaru.  Later, she becomes his wife.  
 Voiced by: Keiko Onodera (Japanese), Lara Cody (English OVA 3), Kari Wahlgren (English GXP, credited as Renee Emerson)
 
 Kiyone Masaki (not to be confused with Kiyone Makibi) is the mother of Tenchi and Tennyo Masaki, as well as the younger sister of Minaho Masaki.  Although she was a loving, kind person and an excellent cook (she had taught Rea Masaki how to cook), she also inherited the playful spirit of her mother Airi Masaki, such as pulling pranks and doing things in an outlandish fashion; it was revealed that, at the time of her death, Kiyone was 248 and suffering from senility.  Prior to her death, Kiyone co-wrote a script for an outlandish explanation of her death for Tenchi when he came of age, titled "Mom is so carefree!"  
 Voiced by: Yuri Amano (Japanese), Petrea Burchard (English OVA 1), Wendee Lee (English OVA 3)
   
 These are the muscle that Mashisu Makibi had accompany her when she tried to have Ryoko Hakubi framed by destroying the Choubimaru.  Baguma is the more muscular of them, and also had telepathic abilities.  Sorunāru relies on spider-like battle-mechas, while Fujimasa uses mechas resembling wolves.
 Baguma voiced by: Yoshinori Sonobe (Japanese), Dan Woren (English)
 Fujimasa voiced by: Hidenari Ugaki (Japanese), Sean Cw Johnson (English)
 Sorunāru voiced by: Katsuyuki Konishi (Japanese), Kim Strauss (English)
 Mamah
 Sasami's nursemaid who appears in episode 9 in OVA 2, she is searching for Sasami during Ryoko's attack on Jurai.

Broadcast history
The English-dubbed version of OVAs 1 and 2 was originally aired on San Jose PBS superstation, KTEH in the late 1990s as part of its Sunday Late-Prime (9pm-after 12) Sci-Fi programming block, and then later picked up by Cartoon Network in July 2000 for broadcast on its Toonami block (US and Europe). The Toonami version was heavily edited for content and to remove blood, profanity and nudity, as well as to shorten the length of the episodes to fit broadcast standards, and featured custom opening and closing credits.  The series also ran on Cartoon Network and then later CNX in the UK.

After Cartoon Network's rights to broadcast the show expired, the now-defunct International Channel (later AZN Television) picked up the rights to air the dubbed version in 2004.

As of April 1, 2012, only one episode of OVA 3 has aired on basic cable television in the United States. However, the Funimation Channel had the third season in rotation for a time.

Tenchi Muyo! Mihoshi Special
 is a special episode of the series.

The special features the anime debut of Kiyone Makibi and Sasami's alter-ego, Pretty Sammy (the latter made her debut in the Tenchi Muyo! drama CD, Tenchi Muyo! Special: Creation of the Universe Journey across Space-Time).

Synopsis
As usual, Mihoshi Kuramitsu was asleep on the deck of the house while everyone else (with the notable exception of Ryoko) was doing chores.  After Ayeka questions Mihoshi's qualifications of being a Galaxy Policewoman, Mihoshi then tells the story of her and her partner Kiyone's greatest adventure: the "Ultra-Energy Matter" caper.

In the story, Mihoshi casts the Masaki household as the various characters in the story: Ryoko as the thief, Tenchi as a Galaxy Policeman, Ayeka as Tenchi's heiress fiancée, Sasami as an apprentice detective, Washu as a mad scientist (not a far stretch of the imagination), and Ryo-Ohki as... Ryo-Ohki.  As the investigation progresses (not to mention romantic rivalries between "Ryoko" and "Ayeka"), the detectives stumble onto a plot to destroy the universe.

Music
Background music was composed by Seikou Nagaoka for the first two series, Akifumi Tada for the third series, and Ryo Sakai for the fourth series.
Opening 1 (episodes 1–6): 
Composed by Seikou Nagaoka
Opening 2 (episodes 8–13): , "I'm a Pioneer" for the English version
Performed by Chisa Yokoyama (Japanese version) and Sharyn Scott (English version)
Opening 3 (episodes 14–18): 
Composed by Akifumi Tada
Opening 4 (episodes 21): 
Performed by Serena Kozuki
Opening 5 (episodes 22): "P.N.K!!"
Performed by Usagi Dash
Opening 6 (episodes 23): 
Performed by Haruna Oshima
Opening 7 (episodes 24): "Brand New Door"
Performed by Ayuka Watanabe
Ending 1 (episodes 1–7): 
Performed by Chisa Yokoyama (Japanese version) and Sharyn Scott (English version)
Ending 2 (episodes 8–13): , "The Lonely Moon" for the English version
Performed by Ai Orikasa (Japanese version) and Scottie Haskell (English version)
Ending 3 (episodes 14–20): "Lovely Cookin'"
Performed by Tomoko Odajima
Ending 4 (episodes 21): "Shake the Dice" (stylized as "Shake the DiCE")
Performed by Serena Kozuki
Ending 5 (episodes 22): "Jumpin' Lovin' Girl"
Performed by +Earth☆Sky (featuring Ayaka Morikawa)
Ending 6 (episodes 23): 
Performed by Aika Ito
Ending 7 (episodes 24): 
Performed by Piyohina
Ending 8 (episodes 25-30): "Gravitation＝Love" (stylized as "Gravitation＝LOVE")
Performed by Kaori Oda
Insert Song (episode 8): 
Performed by Yuko Kobayashi (Japanese version) and Scottie Haskell (English version)
Mihoshi Special
Background music was composed by Seikou Nagaoka.
Opening: 
Performed by Yuko Mizutani and Etsuko Kozakura (Japanese version), and Ellen Gerstell (English version)
Ending: , "Pretty Sammy, the Magical Girl" for the English version
Performed by Chisa Yokoyama (Japanese version) and Sherry Lynn (English version)

Notes

References

External links
 

1992 anime OVAs
Adventure anime and manga
Anime International Company
Fantasy anime and manga
Funimation
Geneon USA
Harem anime and manga
NBCUniversal Entertainment Japan
Shōnen manga
Tenchi Muyo!
Toonami